Adam Wickmer (died 1384) was an English priest and academic in the 14th century.

Wickmer (some sources Walker) became Master of Trinity Hall, Cambridge in 1355.  He held livings at South Malling and Hockwold.

References

Year of birth missing
1384 deaths
Masters of Trinity Hall, Cambridge
Chancellors of the University of Cambridge
14th-century English Roman Catholic priests
15th-century English Roman Catholic priests